The 2009 Indian general election in Punjab, occurred for 13 seats in the state. Punjab went for the Lok sabha elections in two phases-7 May and 13 May. There were 13 parliament seats from Punjab and the elections were held for 4 seats on 7 May and remaining 9 on 13 May.

Results
Indian National Congress got majority of 8 seats. Shiromani Akali Dal and Bharatiya Janata Party got 4 and 1 seats respectively.

Elected MPs

Assembly segments wise lead of Parties

References

Indian general elections in Punjab, India
2000s in Punjab, India
Punjab